José Eduardo Carrasco Villar (born 30 March 1972), known as Eduardo Carrasco, is a former Chilean-Swiss football midfielder.

Personal life
Born in Chile, Carrasco and his parents fled to Lamone (in the canton of Ticino, Switzerland) in 1974 after dictator Augusto Pinochet seized power. He holds both nationalities.

Post-retirement
He has worked as football coach for FC Stella Capriasca.

References

External links
 
 Eduardo Carrasco at Soccerzz.com

1972 births
Living people
People from Coronel
Chilean footballers
Naturalised citizens of Switzerland
Swiss people of Chilean descent
Swiss men's footballers
Sportspeople of Chilean descent
FC Lugano players
FC Lausanne-Sport players
FC Stade Nyonnais players
FC Sion players
Swiss Super League players
Chilean expatriate sportspeople in Switzerland
Expatriate footballers in Switzerland
Association football midfielders
Chilean football managers
Chilean expatriate football managers
Swiss football managers